The 1999 Betty Barclay Cup was a women's tennis tournament played on outdoor clay courts at the Am Rothenbaum in Hamburg in Germany that was part of Tier II of the 1999 WTA Tour. The tournament was held from 26 April through 2 May 1999. Second-seeded Venus Williams won the singles title.

Entrants

Seeds

Other entrants
The following players received wildcards into the singles main draw:
  Andrea Glass
  Julia Abe
The following players received wildcards into the doubles main draw:
  Julia Abe /  Jana Kandarr

The following players received entry from the singles qualifying draw:

  Marion Maruska
  Anca Barna
  Elena Dementieva
  Jana Nejedly

The following players received entry from the doubles qualifying draw:

  Sandra Načuk /  Sylvia Plischke

Finals

Singles

 Venus Williams defeated  Mary Pierce, 6–0, 6–3
 It was Williams' 4th title of the year and the 11th of her career.

Doubles

 Larisa Neiland /  Arantxa Sánchez Vicario defeated  Amanda Coetzer /  Jana Novotná, 6–2, 6–1

References

External links
 ITF tournament edition details

Betty Barclay Cup
WTA Hamburg
1999 in German women's sport
1999 in German tennis